Edinburgh North may refer to:
 Edinburgh North, South Australia
 Edinburgh North (UK Parliament constituency)

It could also mean:
 Edinburgh North and Leith (Scottish Parliament constituency)
 Edinburgh North and Leith (UK Parliament constituency)